Raymond "Tay" Brown (December 29, 1911 – August 16, 1994) was an All-America tackle and captained the 1932 USC Trojans football team which produced Howard Jones' only perfect season at USC.

College career
Brown was a member of USC's national championship teams in 1931 and 1932. He set a Los Angeles Coliseum record of blocking four kicks in one game. 

He was elected to the College Football Hall of Fame in 1980.

Coaching career
Brown served as the head basketball coach and assistant football coach at the University of Cincinnati from 1934 to 1937, and later guided Compton Community College to four Little Rose Bowl invitations while posting a 140–33–9 record at that school.

External links
 
 

1911 births
1994 deaths
American football tackles
Basketball coaches from California
Cincinnati Bearcats football coaches
Cincinnati Bearcats men's basketball coaches
USC Trojans football players
College Football Hall of Fame inductees
Compton Tartars football coaches
Sportspeople from Compton, California
Players of American football from Compton, California